Highland Junior High School, Highlands Junior High School or Highlands Junior School may refer to:

In Canada:
Highland Junior High School (Toronto), Ontario (now named Highland Middle School)
Highlands Junior High School (Edmonton), Alberta

In the United States:
Highland Junior High School (Mesa), Arizona
Highland Junior High School (Gilbert), Arizona
Highland Junior High School (Battle Creek), Michigan
Highland Junior High School (Hobbs), New Mexico
Highland Junior High School (Barberton), Ohio
Highlands Junior High School (Baytown), Texas
Highland Junior High School (Ogden), Utah 

In the UK:
Highlands Junior School (Ilford), London